Protostrongylidae is a family of nematodes belonging to the order Strongylida.

Genera:
 Cystocaulus Schulz et al., 1933
 Dukerostrongylus Dinnik & Boev, 1982
 Elaphostrongylus Cameron, 1931
 Imparispiculus Luo Jianzhong, Duo Jiecaidan & Chen Gang, 1988
 Muellerius Cameron, 1927
 Neostrongylus Gebauer, 1932
 Orthostrongylus Dougherty & Goble, 1946
 Parelaphostrongylus Boev & Schultz, 1950
 Pneumocaulus Schulz & Andreeva, 1948
 Pneumostrongylus Mönnig, 1932
 Protostrongylus Kamensky, 1905
 Skrjabinocaulus Boev & Sulimov, 1963
 Spiculocaulus Schulz, Orlov & Kutass, 1933
 Umingmakstrongylus Hoberg, Polley, Gunn & Nishi, 1995
 Varestrongylus Bhalerao, 1932

References

Nematodes